Charles Doerner (27 February 1912 – unknown) was a Luxembourgian chess player, eleven times Luxembourg Chess Championship winner (1935, 1938, 1939, 1940, 1946, 1947, 1948, 1949, 1950, 1951, 1952).

Biography
From the mid-1930s to the mid-1950s Charles Doerner was one of the leading Luxembourgian chess players. He eleven times won Luxembourg Chess Championships: in 1935, 1938, 1939, 1940, 1946, 1947, 1948, 1949, 1950, 1951, and 1952. Charles Doerner was member of chess club Esch Rochade. He participated in international chess tournament in Maastricht (1946) and Zonal tournament in Hilversum (1947).

Charles Doerner played for Luxembourg in the Chess Olympiads:
 In 1952, at first board in the 10th Chess Olympiad in Helsinki (+1, =1, -12),
 In 1954, at first board in the 11th Chess Olympiad in Amsterdam (+2, =3, -4).

Charles Doerner played for Luxembourg in the European Team Chess Championship preliminaries:
 In 1957, at first board in the 1st European Team Chess Championship preliminaries (+0, =1, -1).

References

External links

Charles Doerner chess games at 365chess.com

1912 births
Year of death missing
Luxembourgian chess players
Chess Olympiad competitors
20th-century chess players